Thomas William House Sr. (March 4, 1814 – January 17, 1880) was a merchant and cotton factor in Houston, Texas. He also invested in and organized transportation and utility companies in the Houston area.  He was a veteran of the Texas Revolution and provided financial assistance to the Confederacy during the American Civil War. He was mayor of Houston, Texas in 1862.

Family life
House was born on March 4, 1814, in Stoke St Gregory, Somerset, England. His family are of Anglo-Saxon, possibly Norse, origin  (from the Old English and Old Norse hūs). In 1840, House married Mary Elizabeth Shearn, the daughter of his business partner, Charles Shearn. One of their sons, Edward Mandell House, served President Woodrow Wilson's administration.

Early business life
In May 1835, House emigrated to New York City. There, he became a successful pastry maker. In 1836, House accepted an invitation from the owner of the St. Charles Hotel in New Orleans, Louisiana, to run the bakery at the hotel.

In 1836, he moved to Texas to fight in the Revolution against Mexico. He was rewarded with a land grant in Coryell County.

In 1838, he opened his own store, House and Loveridge, a bakery and confectionary in Houston, Texas. The next year he formed a new partnership with Charles Shearn, later the chief justice of Harris County. The store produced and sold Houston's first ice cream. The new firm sold candy and dry goods, while buying and selling wholesale with people from the Texas hinterlands. House started offering factoring service around this time, exchanging store goods in exchange for cotton. The store took orders for staples, such as flour and sugar, but also iron castings and percussion caps. House imported goods from Boston, New Orleans, and New York, but made direct cotton shipments to Liverpool, England.

Transportation
In 1850, House was one of the founders of the Houston Plank Road Company, an early attempt to improve wagon transportation to and from the interior. The company raised $150,000 in capital, but it scuttled plans for building oaken-plank roads as the feasibility of railroads emerged.

In 1851, House helped to organize the steamboat company Houston and Galveston Navigation Company. Their steamboats carried not only freight, but also passengers and U.S. mail. Other companies he worked with included the Texas Transportation Company, the Houston Direct Navigation Company, and the Buffalo Bayou Ship Channel Company. All of these companies contributed to Houston's development.

Mid-life and Civil War era
For a brief time, he had a second partnership with his father-in-law Shearn. Later, in 1853, House bought the cotton jobbing business of James H. Stevens and Company, a dealer in dry goods and groceries. He paid $40,000 for it. At the time, it was the largest sum of money to change hands in Houston's history. House renamed the company T.W. House and Company, and began extending loans to cotton planters. Edward Mather, an employee since 1841, was his "company". However, when Mather left in 1862, House was alone in business again. During the time they were together, T.W. House and Company became Texas's largest wholesaler. House prospered selling commodities ranging from hides to syrup and from guns to blacksmithing tools. Ox wagons would wait 12 hours for their goods to be loaded into his store. Out of his store, he built his great private bank.

An ardent supporter of the Confederacy, House supplied the army of Confederacy. When the Houston Light Guard marched off to battle in Virginia, it was nicknamed the Kid Glove Gentry because of the kid gloves House had outfitted each soldier with. His cotton wagons would go to the Mexican border and back, returning with loads of vital supplies. General John B. Magruder was one of many Confederates to recognize the value of House and his business. From his home in Galveston, House would survey the blockading Union fleet on stormy nights. The next morning, he surveyed them again. If one ship was gone, they were usually chasing his blockade runners. The ships would head off to Havana with a load of cotton, and then on to London, where they would return with arms for the Confederacy.  During the war, in 1862, House served one term as the Mayor of Houston.

Later years
House did not stop developing Houston after the Civil War. In 1866, he organized the Houston Gas Company, Houston's first public utility. House erected the plant and the mains at a time when the general public was indifferent. Gas first came to hotels and public places. Slowly, it came to private homes, and eventually gas street lamps were erected on the streets of Houston. He also helped organize the first street railway, the Board of Trade and Cotton Exchange, the Houston and Texas Central Railroad, along with many other railroads. In 1870, his wife of thirty years died. In 1872, House purchased an extensive sugar plantation in Arcola. He also grew cotton. In La Salle County, he had a  ranch. However, his health was failing. After seeking medical attention, House died on January 17, 1880, in San Antonio. His estate was valued at over $500,000, which made him the third richest man in Texas. His will directed that his estate be held together for five years. His mercantile and banking business was also to be operated in his name. One of his sons, Edward M. House, became an adviser to Woodrow Wilson.

References

External links
 A Guide to the Thomas William House Papers, 1838-1872. Briscoe Center for American History, University of Texas-Austin.
 An Inventory of the Thomas William House Papers: 1864-1872 Cushing Memorial Library, Texas A & M University.

1814 births
1880 deaths
Businesspeople from Texas
Mayors of Houston
People of Texas in the American Civil War
People from Taunton Deane (district)
English emigrants to the United States
19th-century American politicians
Burials at Glenwood Cemetery (Houston, Texas)
19th-century American businesspeople